Sevim Sinmez Serbest (born 20 April 1987 in Mersin) is a Turkish track and field athlete competing in high jump, long jump and triple jump.

International competitions

Personal bests

Last updated 28 July 2015.

References



Living people
1987 births
People from Mersin
Turkish female long jumpers
Turkish female triple jumpers
Turkish female high jumpers
Competitors at the 2013 Summer Universiade
Athletes (track and field) at the 2013 Mediterranean Games
Mediterranean Games competitors for Turkey
Islamic Solidarity Games competitors for Turkey
21st-century Turkish women